Skander Kasri (born 29 August 1958) is a Tunisian football manager who is the current manager of Saudi club Al-Bukiryah.

References

1958 births
Living people
Tunisian football managers
Espérance Sportive de Tunis managers
ES Zarzis managers
AS Gabès managers
US Monastir (football) managers
US Tataouine managers
Club Athlétique Bizertin managers
Tunisian expatriate football managers
Expatriate football managers in Saudi Arabia
Tunisian expatriate sportspeople in Saudi Arabia